"Aimer est plus fort que d'être aimé" is a song by Daniel Balavoine.  It was the last single from his last album and was released posthumously in October 1986, nine months after he had died at the age of 33 in a helicopter crash in Mali.

Charts

References

French pop songs
1985 songs
1986 singles
Daniel Balavoine songs
Songs released posthumously
Songs written by Daniel Balavoine
Barclay (record label) singles